The Individualist is a 1995 album by Todd Rundgren, under the pseudonym "TR-i". The second of Todd's TR-I projects, following 1993's No World Order, the album saw Rundgren play all instruments during the recording sessions. Rundgren mixes uptempo numbers, studio gimmickry, and his usual ballads on this mid-1990s release.

The Enhanced CD includes interactive "play" with video experiences (on compatible computers) for every song, and listeners can play "Cast the First Stone" as a video game. "Espresso" and "Woman's World" are also interactive videos.

The lyrical content is largely political and spiritual, with Rundgren expressing his outspoken views against conservatism, particularly on "Family Values" with its slams against Dan Quayle. "Tables Will Turn" is a song about social inequity and how inevitably the situation will change. "If Not Now When" expresses anger against those who claim they want positive change but are too apathetic to act. In accordance with the humanism which has always driven Rundgren's lyrics, in "The Ultimate Crime" he sings "the ultimate crime is not to care." The funky track "Espresso (All Jacked Up)" is a catchy song about travel and having fun in life which could well have scored airplay but didn't. "The Individualist" is a laid-back track utilising rapping, as on No World Order as Rundgren reflects on his desire to see the truth of things and not be subjected to other's views of reality. It includes a humorous jab at Prince's name change: "Change my name to some funky fresh dingbat/Like 'the artist formerly known as TR-i'". "Cast the First Stone" is an example of Rundgren's heavier, more raucous electronic style. In it, Rundgren rails against moral hypocrites. It is similar in feel and sentiment to songs such as "Mammon" and "Liars" on his later Liars album but also to "Fascist Christ" from No World Order. In "Beloved Infidel", a plaintive ballad, Rundgren sings sadly of how the "weak are vilified and wicked glorified"; he awaits the return of the beloved infidel, which seems a metaphor for truth, when the 'liberation bell' will be rung. "Temporary Sanity", which has a rapped middle-eight, is a protest against the insanity of the human race's obsessions with wars and vanity.

Track listing
All songs by Todd Rundgren.
"Tables Will Turn" – 8:51
"If Not Now, When?" – 4:42
"Family Values" – 6:42
"The Ultimate Crime" – 4:37
"Espresso (All Jacked Up)" – 5:51
"The Individualist" – 7:30
"Cast the First Stone" – 5:06
"Beloved Infidel" – 4:11
"Temporary Sanity" – 6:24
"Woman's World" – 9:32

Personnel
Todd Rundgren -	lead vocal, all instruments, producer, engineer
Mary Arnold   - 	choir
Ed Bishop     - 	choir
John Ferenzik - choir
Jesse Gress   -	choir
Ann Lang      - 	choir
Tom Nicholson -	choir

References

Todd Rundgren albums
1995 albums
Albums produced by Todd Rundgren